The Lands of the Bohemian Crown were the states in Central Europe during the medieval and early modern periods with feudal obligations to the Bohemian kings. The crown lands primarily consisted of the Kingdom of Bohemia, an electorate of the Holy Roman Empire according to the Golden Bull of 1356, the Margraviate of Moravia, the Duchies of Silesia, and the two Lusatias, known as the Margraviate of Upper Lusatia and the Margraviate of Lower Lusatia, as well as other territories throughout its history. This agglomeration of states nominally under the rule of the Bohemian kings was referred to simply as Bohemia. They are now sometimes referred to in scholarship as the Czech lands, a direct translation of the Czech abbreviated name.

The joint rule of Corona regni Bohemiae was legally established by decree of King Charles IV issued on 7 April 1348, on the foundation of the original Czech lands ruled by the Přemyslid dynasty until 1306. By linking the territories, the interconnection of crown lands thus no more belonged to a king or a dynasty but to the Bohemian monarchy itself, symbolized by the Crown of Saint Wenceslas. During the reign of King Ferdinand I from 1526, the lands of the Bohemian Crown became a constituent part of the Habsburg monarchy. A large part of Silesia was lost in mid-18th century, but the rest of the Lands passed to the Austrian Empire and the Cisleithanian half of Austria-Hungary. By the Czechoslovak declaration of independence in 1918, the remaining Czech lands became part of the First Czechoslovak Republic.

The Bohemian Crown was neither a personal union nor a federation of equal members. Rather, the Kingdom of Bohemia had a higher status than the other incorporated constituent countries. There were only some common state institutions of the Bohemian Crown that did not survive the centralization of the Habsburg monarchy under Queen Maria Theresa in the 18th century. The most important of them was the Bohemian Court Chancellery which was united with the Austrian Chancellery in 1749.

Name
The Lands of the Bohemian Crown are called země Koruny české or simply Koruna česká (Crown of Bohemia or Bohemian Crown) and České země (i.e. Czech lands), the Czech adjective český referring to both "Bohemian" and "Czech". The German term Länder der Böhmischen Krone is likewise shortened to Böhmische Krone or Böhmische Kronländer. The denotation Lands of the Crown of Saint Wenceslas (země Koruny svatováclavské) refers to the Crown of Saint Wenceslas, part of the regalia of the Bohemian monarchs.

History

Přemyslids
In the 10th and 11th century the Duchy of Bohemia, together with Moravia (the Margraviate of Moravia from 1182 on), and Kłodzko Land were consolidated under the ruling Přemyslid dynasty.

Duke Ottokar I of Bohemia gained the hereditary royal title to the Duchy of Bohemia in 1198, from the German (anti)−king Philip of Swabia, for his support. Along with the title, Philip also raised the duchy to the Kingdom of Bohemia rank. The regality was ultimately confirmed by Philip's nephew the German King Frederick II, later the Holy Roman Emperor (1220−1250), in the Golden Bull of Sicily issued in 1212.

The Přemyslid king Ottokar II of Bohemia acquired the Duchy of Austria in 1251, the Duchy of Styria in 1261, the Egerland in 1266, the Duchy of Carinthia with the March of Carniola and the Windic March in 1269 as well as the March of Friuli in 1272. His plans to turn Bohemia into the leading Imperial State were aborted by his Habsburg rival King Rudolph I of Germany, who seized his acquisitions and finally defeated him in the 1278 Battle on the Marchfeld.

Luxembourgers
In 1306 the House of Luxembourg began producing Bohemian kings upon the extinction of the Přemyslids. They significantly enlarged the Bohemian lands again, including when King John the Blind vassalized most Polish Piast dukes of Silesia. His suzerainty was acknowledged by the Polish king Casimir III the Great in the 1335 Treaty of Trentschin. John also achieved the enfeoffment with the Upper Lusatian lands of Bautzen (1319) and Görlitz (1329), by the German king Louis IV.

King John's eldest son Charles IV was elected King of the Romans in 1346 and succeeded his father as King of Bohemia in the same year. In 1348, Charles IV introduced the concept of the Crown of Bohemia (Corona regni Bohemiae in Latin), a term which designated the whole state hereditarily ruled by the kings of Bohemia, not only its core territory of Bohemia but also the incorporated provinces.

The Luxembourg dynasty reached its high point, when Charles was crowned Holy Roman Emperor in 1355. By his Imperial authority he decreed that the united Bohemian lands should endure regardless of dynastic developments, even if the Luxembourgs should die out.

In 1367 he purchased Lower Lusatia from his stepson Margrave Otto V of Brandenburg and the Margraviate of Brandenburg. Beside their home County of Luxembourg itself, the dynasty held further non-contiguous Imperial fiefs in the Low Countries, such as: the Duchy of Brabant and Duchy of Limburg, acquired through marriage by Charles' younger half-brother Wenceslaus of Luxembourg in 1355; as well as the Margraviate of Brandenburg purchased in 1373. As both the King of Bohemia and the Margrave of Brandenburg had been designated Prince-electors in the Golden Bull of 1356, the Luxembourgs held two votes in the electoral college, securing the succession of Charles's son Wenceslaus in 1376.

With King Wenceslaus, the decline of the Luxembourg dynasty began. He himself was deposed as King of the Romans in 1400. The Duchies of Brabant, Limburg (in 1406), and even Luxembourg itself (in 1411) were ceded to the French House of Valois-Burgundy; while the Margraviate of Brandenburg passed to the House of Hohenzollern (in 1415). Nevertheless, the joint rule of the Bohemian Lands outlived the Hussite Wars and the extinction of the Luxembourg male line upon the death of Emperor Sigismund in 1437.

Jagiellons
Vladislas II of the Jagiellon dynasty, son of the Polish king Casimir IV, was designated King of Bohemia in 1471, while the crown lands of Moravia, Silesia, and the Lusatias were occupied by rivaling King Matthias Corvinus of Hungary. In 1479 both kings signed the Treaty of Olomouc, whereby the unity of the Bohemian crown lands was officially retained unchanged and the monarchs appointed each other as sole heir. Upon the death of King Matthias in 1490, Vladislas ruled the Bohemian crown lands and the Kingdom of Hungary in personal union.

Habsburgs

When Vladislas' only son Louis was killed at the Battle of Mohács in 1526 ending the Jagiellon dynasty rule in Bohemia, a convention of Bohemian nobles elected his brother-in-law, the Habsburg archduke Ferdinand I of Austria, as the new king of the Bohemian crown lands. Together with the Archduchy of Austria "hereditary lands" and the Hungarian kingdom, they formed the Habsburg monarchy, which in the following centuries grew out of the Holy Roman Empire into a separate European power. Attempts by the Bohemian Protestant Reformation estates to build up an autonomous confederation were dashed at the 1620 Battle of White Mountain, whereafter the administration was centralised at Vienna. Moreover, the Habsburg rulers lost the Lusatias to the Electorate of Saxony after the Thirty Years' War in the 1635 Peace of Prague, and also most of Silesia with Kladsko to the Kingdom of Prussia after the First Silesian War in the 1742 Treaty of Breslau.

In the Modern era, the remaining crown lands of Bohemia, Moravia and Austrian Silesia became constituent parts of the Austrian Empire in 1804, and later the Cisleithanian half of Austria-Hungary in 1867.

After World War I and the dissolution of the Austro-Hungarian monarchy, these became the historic regions usually referred to as the Czech lands forming the Czech Republic. Austrian Silesia with the Hlučín Region is today known as Czech Silesia, with the exception of eastern Cieszyn Silesia which passed to the Second Polish Republic in 1920.

Bohemian territories

Crown lands

Other territories

  The Brandenburg Electorate, acquired by Charles IV from Margrave Otto V in 1373. Charles' son Sigismund lost Brandenburg in 1415 to Frederick I, Elector of Brandenburg.
  The adjacent northern part of the Upper Palatinate ("Bohemian Palatinate") at Sulzbach, incorporated by Charles IV in 1355. Charles' son Wenceslaus lost the area in 1401 to the Electorate of the Palatinate under King Ruprecht of Germany.
  Egerland

Administrative divisions

See also

Czech lands
History of the Czech lands
List of rulers of Bohemia
Lands of the Crown of Saint Stephen
Crown of the Kingdom of Poland
Crown of Aragon
Crown of Castille
Real union

References

External links
 "Bohemia". BBC Radio 4 discussion with Norman Davies, Karin Friedrich and Robert Pynsent (In Our Time; April 11, 2002).

 
01
History of Bohemia
History of the Czech lands
Bohemian
1348 establishments in Europe
1918 disestablishments in Europe
Former monarchies of Europe
States of the Holy Roman Empire